The 1977 Men's World Weightlifting Championships were held in Stuttgart, West Germany from September 17 to September 25, 1977. There were 186 men in action from 44 nations.

Medal summary

Medal table
Ranking by Big (Total result) medals 

Ranking by all medals: Big (Total result) and Small (Snatch and Clean & Jerk)

References
Results (Sport 123)
Weightlifting World Championships Seniors Statistics

External links
International Weightlifting Federation

World Weightlifting Championships
World Weightlifting Championships
International weightlifting competitions hosted by Germany
1977 in weightlifting
International sports competitions hosted by West Germany